Christian Chamorel (born 1979, in Lausanne) is a Swiss pianist.

He was trained at Lausanne, Munich and Zürich's Conservatories, graduating in 2004 and 2006; while a student he was prized by the Yamaha, Leenaards and Kiefer Hablitzel foundations. He has performed through Western Europe since. Chamorel had his recording debut in 2005 with a Franz Liszt monographic; that same year he was prized by Geneva's Societé des Arts.

Chamorel teaches at the Conservatoire de musique de Genève since September 2007.

References
 Abbaye des Agriculteurs Preverenges
 Conservatoire de musique de Genève

Swiss classical pianists
1979 births
Living people
21st-century classical pianists